Calum Gourlay is a Scottish jazz bassist, composer, and band leader.

Career
The son of a music teacher, Gourlay grew up in Glasgow. At the age of ten he began learning the cello, then four years later started playing double bass. He heard Scottish jazz musicians at workshops taught by his father on Saturday mornings. He moved from Glasgow to Dunfermline, participating in the Fife Youth Jazz Orchestra and the Strathclyde Youth Jazz Orchestra. He played in a youth band led by Tommy Smith until 2004 when he traveled to London to attend the Royal Academy of Music. At the school he met three people who would become bandmates: Trish Clowes, Kit Downes, and Freddie Gavita. Gourlay has taught at the Royal Academy and Trinity Laban Conservatoire of Music and Dance

Discography

As leader
 Live at the Ridgeway (2015)
 New Ears Quartet (Ubuntu Music, 2019)

As sideman
With Kit Downes
 Golden (Basho, 2009)
 Quiet Tiger (Basho, 2011)
 Light from Old Stars (Basho, 2013)

With Tommy Smith and the Scottish National Jazz Orchestra
 American Adventure (Spartacus, 2013)
 Embodying the Light (Spartacus, 2017)
 Sweet Sister Suite by Kenny Wheeler (Spartacus, 2018)

With others
 Arild Andersen, Celebration (ECM, 2012)
 Richard Rodney Bennett, Saxophone Concerto/Reflections On a 16th Century Tune (BBC, 2018)
 Kurt Elling, Passion World (Concord Jazz, 2015)
 Makoto Ozone, Jeunehomme: Piano Concerto No. 9 (Spartacus, 2017)
 Colin Steele, Joni (Marina, 2020)
 Anthony Strong, Stepping Out (Naive, 2013)

References

Living people
20th-century births
21st-century British male musicians
21st-century jazz composers
Alumni of the Royal Academy of Music
British jazz bandleaders
British jazz composers
British jazz musicians
Male double-bassists
Scottish jazz composers
Year of birth missing (living people)